The American Psychological Association's Award for Distinguished Contributions to the International Advancement of Psychology is awarded for "distinguished and enduring lifetime contributions to the international cooperation and advancement of knowledge in psychology."

Recipients 
Source: APA

 1991 Otto Klineberg
 1992 Henry David
 1993 Çigdem Kagitçibasi
 1994 Frances Culbertson  and Harry C. Triandis
 1995 Paul B. Baltes and Wayne H. Holtzman
 1996 Florence Denmark  and Anthony J. Marsella
 1997 Mark R. Rosenzweig
 1998/1999 Edwin A. Fleishman
 2000 Florence W. Kaslow  and Juris G. Draguns
 2002 Stanley C. Krippner
 2003 Thomas D. Oakland
 2004 Ronald P. Rohner
 2005 Gary B. Melton and Charles D. Spielberger
 2006 Michael Cole
 2007 Ruben Ardila and Frederick T.L. Leong
 2008 Puncky Paul Heppner
 2009 Judith Torney-Purta
 2010 Paul Pedersen
 2011 Dan Olweus
 2012 Fanny M. Cheung and Dan Landis
 2013 Maria Cristina Richaud and Fons van de Vijver
 2014 Saths Cooper
 2015 Walter J. Lonner
 2016 Héctor Fernández-Álvarez
 2017 Mary P. Koss
 2018 Mary Jane Rotheram-Borus 
 2019 Lawrence Gerstein
 2020 Sharon Horne

See also
 List of psychology awards
 List of prizes named after people

References

American Psychological Association
American psychology awards
Awards established in 1991